Las Leñas is a ski resort in Argentina, located in the western part of Mendoza Province.
It has reliable powder snow and climate for extreme and off-piste skiing. Construction of the ski center began January 1983, and by July 1983, it opened with a 300 bed hotel. The ski area has a good diversity of slopes ranging from very easy to extreme, including a good range of off-piste areas apt for extreme skiing. The total ski area reachable by land is the largest in South America. It currently houses Piscis Hotel, the highest casino by elevation in the world.

The skiing season usually lasts from mid June to mid October; however, recent seasons have ended as early as mid-September. The center is also open during the southern hemisphere summer for mountain activities including mountain biking, horse riding, climbing and other activities.

The ski center includes a ski and snowboard school for all ages and childcare facilities. Specific workshops are also offered at the school to profit from the huge expanses of off-piste runs offered by the area.

The accommodations available on-site include hotels (mostly up-scale), apartment hotels and sleep houses. There is a small shopping center that includes a bank, ski-related shops, chocolate shops, souvenir shops, and a supermarket. Coffee houses, restaurants, and night clubs complete the town's commercial center.

Far away from large cities, the center is seldom crowded except during weekends, making the lines on the lifts usually shorter than in other ski centers of Argentina.

Las Leñas hosted men's Downhill events for the 1986 and 1987 Alpine Skiing World Cup, women's Downhill and Super-G events in 1990 and the only Winter Pan American Games in 1990.

Geographic location 
Aeroplanes make use of the Comodoro D. Ricardo Salomón Airport close to Malargüe, some 95 km from Las Leñas, and the Suboficial Aytes Germano Airport near San Rafael (regular domestic flights) where buses make the connection with Las Leñas.

The road to Las Leñas is paved and seldom blocked by snow, although bad weather or poor surface conditions can sometimes lead to its being temporarily closed by the Gendarmería (border guards). Vehicles are required to use snow chains unless they are equipped with appropriate tires for snow and ice.

Elevation 
 Base: 2,240 m (7,350 feet) 
 Mid-mountain: 2,835 m (9,301 feet) 
 Top: 3,430 m (11,250 feet) 
 Vertical drop: 1,230 m (4,040 feet)

Climate 
According to the Köppen climate classification, Las Leñas has a warm-summer mediterranean continental climate (Dsb), as 4 months have an average temperature above  and at least one month (in its case 3, being June, July, and August) has an average temperature below . This (continental) climate type is highly atypical of South America and the Southern Hemisphere at large, only found in a handful of other stations like Puente del Inca. Summers are moderate and very dry, while winters are very snowy.

International events

Winter Pan American Games
In 1987 members of the Pan American Sports Organization (PASO) determined that the first Winter Pan American Games should take place in Las Leñas, Argentina in 1989 and be held every four years thereafter, but the lack of snow forced the inaugural Games to be postponed until 1990. The first Winter Pan American Games were held from September 16 to 22, with 97 athletes from eight nations participating: Argentina, Bolivia, Brazil, Canada, Chile, Colombia, Mexico and United States. The Games consisted of six events for only one sport, Alpine Skiing, with three disciplines: Slalom, Giant slalom and Super-G.

Alpine Skiing World Cup
On August 16 and 18, 1985 Las Leñas became the first Argentine ski resort to host an event for the International Ski Federation's Alpine Skiing World Cup. The first two Men's Downhill races of the 1985-86 season were held in Mendoza and the results were as follows:

The following year Las Leñas held again the first two Men's Downhill races of the 1986-87 season, this time on August 15 and 16, 1986. The results were as follows:

The Alpine Skiing World Cup was once again held in Las Leñas for the 1989-90 season. This time the events that took place in Argentina were the Women's Downhill (Race 1), on August 8, and Women's Super G (Race 2), on August 9. Once again both races started the season. The results were as follows:

See also 

 Cerro Catedral
 Cerro Castor
 Chapelco
 List of ski areas and resorts in South America

References

External links 

 Las Leñas: maps, weather, hotels and webcam
 Las Leñas official web site
 OnTheSnow.com snow report for Las Leñas
 Hotels and Cabins in Los Molles, Mendoza?
 Las Leñas: How to get there, resort review, hotel packages and snow forecast

Ski areas and resorts in Argentina
Valleys of Argentina
Sport in Mendoza Province
Tourist attractions in Mendoza Province
Sports venues completed in 1983
1983 establishments in Argentina
Hotels established in 1983
Hotel buildings completed in 1983
Apartment hotels